Derbyhaven ("King's Harbour" or "King's Cove") is a hamlet near Castletown in the southern parish of Malew, Isle of Man. It is located on the isthmus connecting Langness Peninsula to the rest of the island, on the bay of the same name, and also on Castletown Bay on the other side of the isthmus.

In the 17th century it was a significant port. The then Lord of Mann, James, 7th Earl of Derby, had the fort on nearby St Michael's Isle (Fort Island) rebuilt in 1645 (Henry VIII built the original fort in 1540) to protect Derbyhaven from the parliamentarians in the English Civil War. Later, in the 18th century, the fort served as a lighthouse.

Derbyhaven has a plaque commemorating the Battle of Ronaldsway, in which a Manx revolt led by Guðrøðr Magnússon was utterly crushed by Scottish forces in 1275.

External links
 Photographs by Jon Wornham
 The Lords of Man in the Middle Ages
 Where the Battle of Ronaldsway is given as 1270.
 Manx National Heritage - Eiraght Ashoonagh Vannin
 The Friends of Manx National Heritage

Villages in the Isle of Man